Dismorphia thermesina is a butterfly in the  family Pieridae. It is found in Peru and Bolivia.

Subspecies
The following subspecies are recognised:
Dismorphia thermesina thermesina (Peru)
Dismorphia thermesina pimpla (Hopffer, 1874) (Bolivia)

References

Dismorphiinae
Pieridae of South America
Fauna of the Andes
Lepidoptera of Peru
Invertebrates of Bolivia
Butterflies described in 1874
Taxa named by Carl Heinrich Hopffer